William the Lawless was the last story collection in the William Books series. It was published posthumously in 1970 following the death of the author, Richmal Crompton, in 1969.

In one story William helps an old man with his sorely neglected garden by presenting the OAP with plants 'borrowed' from his sister's rockery. In the same spirit of helpfulness, William and the Outlaws decide to give their form master a very special wedding present. But when William goes in search of the perfect gift, disaster can never be far behind... Archie also makes a re-entry and General Moult celebrates his 90th birthday, confessing he has never felt so happy, 'since the relief of Mafeking'.

References 

1970 short story collections
Short story collections by Richmal Crompton
British short stories
Children's short story collections
Just William
1970 children's books